Carbonara is a Roman pasta dish made with eggs, hard cheese, cured pork and black pepper. The dish took its modern form and name in the middle of the 20th century.

The cheese is usually Pecorino Romano, Parmigiano-Reggiano, or a combination of the two. Spaghetti is the most common pasta, but fettuccine, rigatoni, linguine, or bucatini are also used. Normally guanciale or pancetta are used for the meat component, but lardons of smoked bacon are a common substitute outside Italy.

Origin and history
As with many recipes, the origins of the dish and its name are obscure; however, most sources trace its origin to the region of Lazio.

The dish forms part of a family of dishes involving pasta with bacon, cheese, and pepper, one of which is pasta alla gricia. Indeed, it is very similar to pasta cacio e uova, a dish dressed with melted lard and a mixture of eggs and cheese, which is documented as long ago as 1839, and, according to some researchers and older Italians, may have been the pre-Second World War name of carbonara.

There are many theories for the origin of the name carbonara, which is likely more recent than the dish itself. Since the name is derived from carbonaro (the Italian word for 'charcoal burner'), some believe the dish was first made as a hearty meal for Italian charcoal workers. In parts of the United States, this etymology gave rise to the term "coal miner's spaghetti". It has even been suggested that it was created as a tribute to the Carbonari ('charcoalmen') secret society prominent in the early, repressed stages of Italian unification in the early 19th century. It seems more likely that it is an "urban dish" from Rome, perhaps popularized by the restaurant La Carbonara in Rome.

The names pasta alla carbonara and spaghetti alla carbonara are unrecorded before the Second World War; notably, it is absent from Ada Boni's 1930 La Cucina Romana ("Roman cuisine"). The carbonara name is first attested in 1950, when it was described in the Italian newspaper La Stampa as a dish sought by American officers after the Allied liberation of Rome in 1944. It was described as a "Roman dish" at a time when many Italians were eating eggs and bacon supplied by troops from the United States. In 1954, it was included in Elizabeth David's Italian Food, an English-language cookbook published in Great Britain.

Preparation
The pasta is cooked in moderately salted boiling water. The guanciale is briefly fried in a pan in its own fat. A mixture of raw eggs (or yolks), grated Pecorino romano and a liberal amount of ground black pepper is combined with the hot pasta either in the pasta pot or in a serving dish, but away from direct heat, to avoid curdling the egg. The fried guanciale is then added, and the mixture is tossed, creating a rich, creamy sauce with bits of meat spread throughout.  Although various shapes of pasta can be used, the raw egg can only cook properly with a shape that has a sufficiently large ratio of surface area to volume, such as the long, thin types fettuccine, linguine, tagliatelle or spaghetti.

Guanciale is the most commonly used meat for the dish in Italy, but pancetta and pancetta affumicata are also used and, in English-speaking countries, bacon is often used as a substitute. The usual cheese is Pecorino Romano; occasionally Parmesan. Recipes differ as to how eggs are used—some use the whole egg, some others only the yolk, and still others a mixture.

Variations
Some preparations have more sauce and therefore use tubular pasta, such as penne, which is better suited to holding sauce. Cream is not used in most Italian recipes, with some exceptions. However, it is often employed in other countries. Similarly, garlic is found in some recipes, but mostly outside Italy. Outside Italy, variations on carbonara may include green peas, broccoli, broccolini, leeks, onions, other vegetables or mushrooms, and may substitute a meat like ham or coppa for the fattier guanciale or pancetta.

Carbonara sauce
Carbonara sauce is sold as a ready-to-eat convenience food in grocery stores in many countries. Unlike the original preparation, which is inseparable from its dish as its creamy texture is created on the pasta itself, the commercial versions of carbonara are prepared sauces to be applied onto separately cooked pasta. They may be thickened with cream and sometimes food starch, while often using bacon or cubed pancetta slices as its meat of choice instead of guanciale.

See also 

 Cacio e pepe
 Fettuccine Alfredo
 Pasta primavera

References

Bibliography
 

Cuisine of Lazio
Italian sauces
Spaghetti dishes